The Wokingham Half Marathon is an annual half marathon held in Wokingham, Berkshire, England since 1984. The race currently starts and finishes at Cantley Park. It is a UK Athletics BARR Gold Graded Event. The 2008 event attracted a field of over 2,500 runners. The 2009 event, due to be held on 8 February, was cancelled due to adverse weather conditions and rearranged to May.

The course record is held by Phil Wicks who ran in 1:03:14 in 2012. The Ladies record was set in 2008 by Liz Yelling who ran in 1:11:09.

Recent winners

References

External links
 

Sport in Berkshire
Half marathons in the United Kingdom
Wokingham